Marrakesh Stadium (Berber: Annar n Mrraksh) is a multi-use stadium in Marrakesh, Morocco. It was designed by Gregotti Associati International.

Completed in January 2012, it is used mostly for football matches with the capability of hosting Olympic Games. It is home to Kawkab Marrakesh football team. The stadium has a capacity of 45,240 people.  It replaces Stade Al Harti as the home of Kawkab Marrakech and as the main stadium of the city.

It hosted the 2014 IAAF Continental Cup, four games including the final in the 2014 FIFA Club World Cup, and the 2014 African Championships in Athletics.

History

Construction
Launched on September, 2003, the construction of the stadium lasted 7 years and 3 months. Inauguration took place on January 5, 2011, with friendlies involving two Moroccan teams ; Kawkab Marrakech and Wydad Casablanca facing two French teams ; Olympique Lyonnais and Paris Saint Germain.

Criticism
After more than seven years in construction, the Marrakchis people and the contributors unveiled the first stadium in the world to be both rectangular and host a running track. The criticism from that branched from these constructive decisions is that the distance from the running track to the bleachers is much too far. Considered a fault to the builders, the space contrast is attributed to a lack of potential spectators in the stadium, who avoid the stadium due to poor vision.

Means of access
It is served by the international airport Marrakesh - Menara at fourteen kilometers, and the railway station of the city. Access to the stadium is provided by sixteen doors and a grand entrance.

International events
The stadium hosted the following international events:
2013 FIFA Club World Cup Final
2014 FIFA Club World Cup Final

References

External links
Photos of construction of stadium
Stadium Guide Article

Football venues in Morocco
S
Buildings and structures in Marrakesh
Athletics (track and field) venues in Morocco
Sports venues completed in 2011
2011 establishments in Morocco
Kawkab Marrakech
21st-century architecture in Morocco